The Fourth is a 1972 Soviet drama film directed by Aleksandr Stolper.

Plot 
The film tells about an American journalist who has to make a difficult choice: to publicize the plans of supporters of the war, having lost all his life's benefits or to retreat.

Cast 
 Vladimir Vysotsky		
 Margarita Terekhova	
 Sergey Shakurov
 Alexander Kaidanovsky	
 Sergey Sazontev
 Yury Solomin		
 Tatyana Vasileva
 Maris Liepa
 Armen Dzhigarkhanyan
 Juozas Budraitis
 Mihai Volontir
 Lev Durov
 Leonid Kulagin

References

External links 
 

1972 films
1970s Russian-language films
Soviet drama films
1972 drama films
Mosfilm films
Films directed by Aleksandr Stolper